Didier Kougbenya is a footballer who plays for Dila Gori.

Honours
Liga Leumit
Winner (1): 2016-17

References

1995 births
Living people
Togolese footballers
Beitar Tel Aviv Bat Yam F.C. players
F.C. Ashdod players
Maccabi Kiryat Gat F.C. players
Maccabi Netanya F.C. players
FC Dila Gori players
Hapoel Hadera F.C. players
Liga Leumit players
Erovnuli Liga players
Expatriate footballers in Israel
Togolese expatriate sportspeople in Israel
Expatriate footballers in Georgia (country)
Togolese expatriate sportspeople in Georgia (country)
Association football midfielders
Togo youth international footballers
21st-century Togolese people